Gerry 'The Bee' Boyle (born 1956) is an American novelist.

Early life
The grandson of Irish immigrants, Boyle was born in Chicago. His parents soon moved to Rhode Island, where he graduated from high school in Warwick. He graduated from Colby College in Maine, Class of 1978, majoring in literature, and began to write short stories and poetry.

Career
Boyle's first career was in journalism. He began as a reporter at the Rumford Falls Times, a weekly in Rumford, a Maine paper-mill town, then moved to the Morning Sentinel, a daily in Waterville, Maine, his old college town, going on to become a full-time columnist on the paper.

As Boyle traveled around Maine looking for stories, he invented a freelance journalist-detective called Jack McMorrow. The first McMorrow mystery, Deadline, was published in 1993. Two years later, it was followed by Bloodline, and there are now nine books in the series.

Boyle left the Morning Sentinel in 1999 but until 2001 continued to write a column for the paper from time to time. In 2000, he became editor of Colby Magazine.

Cover Story, Pretty Dead, and Once Burned received starred reviews from Publishers Weekly.

Personal life
Boyle married Mary Victoria Foley, a schoolteacher. They have three children and live in China, Maine.

Novels

Jack McMorrow Series
Deadline (North Country Press, Maine, 1993)
Bloodline (Putnam, 1995)
Lifeline (Putnam, 1996)
Potshot (Putnam, 1997)
Borderline (Berkley, 1998)
Cover Story (Berkley Prime Crime, 1999)
Pretty Dead (Berkley Prime Crime, 2003)
Home Body (Berkley Prime Crime, 2004)
Damaged Goods (Down East, 2010)
Once Burned (Islandport, 2015)
Straw Man (Islandport, 2016)
Random Act (Islandport, 2019)

Brandon Blake Series
Port City Shakedown (2009)
Port City Black and White (Down East, 2011)

External links
About Gerry Boyle at gerryboyle.com
Gerry Boyle at fantasticfiction.co.uk

20th-century American novelists
20th-century American male writers
Colby College alumni
1956 births
Living people
Writers from Chicago
Writers from Rhode Island
Novelists from Maine
People from China, Maine
American male journalists
American male novelists
21st-century American novelists
21st-century American male writers
Novelists from Illinois
20th-century American non-fiction writers
21st-century American non-fiction writers

References